Aase Nordmo Løvberg (10 June 192325 January 2013) was a Norwegian opera soprano. Dagbladet called her "one of Norway's greatest opera singers." For many years she sang with Jussi Björling at the Royal Opera in Stockholm, and she also sang under renowned conductors such as Herbert von Karajan and Georg Solti.

Early life
Løvberg was born in Målselv, Troms in 1923. Her family were farmers.

Career

Løvberg made her professional début in Oslo in 1948 at the University of Oslo. 

She sang at the Concert Hall in Stockholm during the 1952 Olympics. That year, she moved to Stockholm, where she would live until the 1970. Jussi Björling and Birgit Nilsson were two of the singers with whom she regularly performed. In 1957, Herbert von Karajan asked Løvberg to perform at the Vienna State Opera. She accepted, making her international debut as Sieglinde in Die Walküre. That year, she was appointed a knight of the first class for the Order of St. Olav. 

Løvberg performed at the Metropolitan Opera and the Covent Garden Opera. 

She became Norway's first professor of singing when the Norwegian Academy of Music opened in 1973. She was director of the Norwegian Opera starting in 1978.

Later life and legacy

In 1981, she retired from her position as director of the Opera. That year, she was also named a commander of the Order of St. Olav. 

Løvberg lived her last years in Lillehammer, Oppland, where she died aged 89.  

She is also a member of the Order of the Polar Star.

Further reading
Works about Aase Nordmo Løvberg
Baxter, Robert. "Aase Nordmo Lovberg (sound recording)." The Opera Quarterly 20, no. 4 (2004): 750-752.
Sandvik, Guri. Aase Nordmo Løvberg. Lublin: Orkana (2008).

References

Further reading

External links

1923 births
2013 deaths
People from Målselv
Academic staff of the Norwegian Academy of Music
Norwegian operatic sopranos